This is a list of Members of Parliament (MPs) elected in the 1868 general election.



Notes

References

See also
UK general election, 1868
List of parliaments of the United Kingdom

1874
 List
UK MPs
1868 United Kingdom general election